Fionnghuala Manon "Fionnula" Flanagan (born 10 December 1941) is an Irish stage, television, and film actress. For her contributions to the entertainment industry, she was given the IFTA Lifetime Achievement Award in 2012.  Flanagan is known for her roles in the films James Joyce's Women (1985) and The Others (2001), for the latter of which she won a Saturn Award. She was honored with the Maureen O'Hara Award at the Kerry Film Festival in 2011, the award is offered to women who have excelled in their chosen field in film. She was also nominated for two Primetime Emmy Awards (winning one) and two Tony Awards during her acting career. In 2020, she was listed at #23 on The Irish Times list of Ireland's greatest film actors.

Early life and education
Flanagan was born and raised in Dublin, the daughter of Rosanna (née McGuirk) and Terence Niall Flanagan. Her father was an Irish Army officer and Communist who had fought in the International Brigades in the Spanish Civil War against Franco's Nationalists. Although her parents were not Irish speakers, they wanted Fionnula and her four siblings to learn the Irish language; thus she grew up speaking English and Irish fluently. She was educated in Switzerland and England. She trained extensively at the Abbey Theatre in Dublin and travelled throughout Europe before settling in Los Angeles in early 1968.

Career

Flanagan made her acting debut as the lead role of Máire in Máiréad Ní Ghráda's Irish-language play An Triail at the Damer Theatre in 1964. She continued the role in the radio version and rose to national prominence in the Teilifís Éireann television adaptation, for which she won the 1965 Jacob's Award for her "outstanding performance". With her portrayal of Gerty McDowell in the film version of Ulysses (1967), Flanagan established herself as one of the foremost interpreters of James Joyce. She made her Broadway debut in Brian Friel's Lovers (1968), then appeared in The Incomparable Max (1971) and such Joycean theatrical projects as Ulysses in Nighttown (as Molly Bloom) and James Joyce's Women (1977; toured through 1979), a one-woman show written by Flanagan and directed for the stage by Burgess Meredith. It was subsequently filmed in 1983, with Flanagan both producing and playing all six main female roles (Joyce's wife, Nora Barnacle, as well as fictional characters Molly Bloom, Gerty McDowell, etc.). In 2018 she returned to Broadway in Jez Butterworth's The Ferryman, directed by Sam Mendes.

A familiar presence in American television, Flanagan has appeared in several made-for-TV movies including The Legend of Lizzie Borden (1975) starring Elizabeth Montgomery, Mary White (1977), The Ewok Adventure (1984) and A Winner Never Quits (1986). She won an Emmy Award for her performance as Clothilde in the 1976 network miniseries Rich Man, Poor Man. Her weekly-series stints have included Aunt Molly Culhane in How the West Was Won (1977), which earned her a second Emmy Award nomination. She did multiple appearances on Murder, She Wrote, one of them as Freida, a secretary aiding Jessica Fletcher in finding a murderer on the episode Steal me a Story (1987). She played Lt. Guyla Cook in Hard Copy (1987), and as Kathleen Meacham, wife of a police chief played by John Mahoney in H.E.L.P. (1990).

She made guest appearances in three of the Star Trek series: Star Trek: Deep Space Nine in episode "Dax", playing Enina Tandro; Star Trek: The Next Generation in episode "Inheritance", in which she played Juliana Soong (Data's "mother"); and Star Trek: Enterprise in episode "Fallen Hero", playing the Vulcan Ambassador V'Lar.

Flanagan guest-starred in several episodes of Lost as Eloise Hawking. She appeared in such films as The Others opposite Nicole Kidman, The Divine Secrets of the Ya-Ya Sisterhood as the eldest Teensy, and Waking Ned. She appeared in television series and stage productions including the Emmy-nominated miniseries Revelations, starring Bill Pullman and Natascha McElhone, and in Transamerica, starring Felicity Huffman. From 2006 to 2008, she played Rose Caffee, the matriarch of an Irish-American Rhode Island family on the Showtime drama Brotherhood.

Personal life
Flanagan appeared with Helen Mirren in Some Mother's Son, written and directed by Terry George, as the militantly supportive mother of a Provisional Irish Republican Army hunger striker in 1981. Subsequently, she spoke at a memorial hosted by Sinn Féin at the Citywest Hotel in Dublin for Irish republicans and their kin who were killed during the latest episode of the Troubles in Northern Ireland.

Flanagan and her late husband Garrett O'Connor, an Irish nationalist from Dublin, were known to host parties at their Hollywood Hills home for people in the Irish community. In July 2009, she joined Sinn Féin president Gerry Adams for a series of lectures across the US supporting Irish unity. In October 2011, she announced her support for Sinn Féin politician Martin McGuinness in his unsuccessful bid in Ireland's 2011 presidential election.

Filmography

Film

Television

Awards and recognition
 IFTA Lifetime Achievement gong at the 9th Irish Film and Television Awards
 NUI Galway honorary doctorate awarded for her services to theatrical and film arts

References

External links

 
 
 

1941 births
Living people
Irish expatriates in the United States
Irish film actresses
Irish television actresses
Irish stage actresses
Actresses from Dublin (city)
Emmy Award winners
Jacob's Award winners
20th-century Irish actresses
21st-century Irish actresses
People from Churchtown, Dublin
Expatriate actresses in the United States